Express News is an Urdu language Pakistani television news channel based in Karachi, launched on January 1, 2008. It is owned by Lakson Group which also runs the country's third largest Urdu daily, Daily Express. The owners of the channel, launched 'Express 24/7', a 24-hour Pakistani English news channel on February 5, 2009. Express News is one of the most-watched television news channels in Pakistan. The channel ranked 4th in its news category.

Express Media Group launched their entertainment channel Express Entertainment on 1 January 2012.
EMG had also launched their channel, Hero TV, from 5 June 2012.

Current broadcast
 The Review
 To The Point
 Kal Tak
 Wo Kya Hai
 Sports Page
 Express Expert
 Grift
 Center Stage
 The Expresso Morning Show
 Takrar

Former broadcast
Aks
Darling
E Tech
Game On Hai
 Khabardaar

See also 

 List of news channels in Pakistan
 Express Entertainment
 Takrar
 List of television stations in Pakistan

References

External links
 Official website

Pakistani companies established in 2008
24-hour television news channels in Pakistan
Television channels and stations established in 2008
Urdu-language mass media
Urdu-language television channels in the United Kingdom
Urdu-language television stations in the United States
Television stations in Pakistan
Television stations in Karachi